In abstract algebra, the superreal numbers are a class of extensions of the real numbers, introduced by H. Garth Dales and W. Hugh Woodin as a generalization of the hyperreal numbers and primarily of interest in non-standard analysis, model theory, and the study of Banach algebras.  The field of superreals is itself a subfield of the surreal numbers.

Dales and Woodin's superreals are distinct from the super-real numbers of David O. Tall, which are lexicographically ordered fractions of formal power series over the reals.

Formal definition
Suppose X is a Tychonoff space and C(X) is the algebra of continuous real-valued functions on X. Suppose P is a prime ideal in C(X). Then the factor algebra A = C(X)/P is by definition an integral domain that is a real algebra and that can be seen to be totally ordered.

If the prime ideal P is a maximal ideal, then F is a field of hyperreal numbers (Robinson's hyperreals being a very special case).

References

Bibliography  
 
 

Field (mathematics)
Real closed field
Infinity